Lawrence Semon (February 9, 1889 – October 8, 1928) was an American actor, director, producer, and screenwriter during the silent film era. In his day, Semon was considered a major movie comedian, but he is now remembered mainly for working with both Stan Laurel and Oliver Hardy before they started working together.

He is also sometimes noted for directing (as well as appearing in) the 1925 silent film The Wizard of Oz, which had a slight influence on the better-known 1939 talkie The Wizard of Oz released by MGM. The film was included in the 2005 three-disc DVD version of the 1939 film, along with other silent Oz movies.

Early life
Born in West Point, Mississippi, Semon was the son of a travelling Jewish vaudeville magician Zera Semon, who billed himself as "Zera the Great". His mother, Irene Semon (née Rea) worked as his assistant. Along with his older sister, Semon joined his parents' act until his father's death. After completing his education in Savannah, Georgia, Semon moved to New York City, where he worked for The New York Sun and later The New York Morning Telegraph as a cartoonist, comics artist and graphic artist. While working as an artist, Semon appeared in monologues in vaudeville, where he attracted the attention of Vitagraph Studios. In 1915, he was offered a contract with the company.

Career
After signing with Vitagraph, Semon worked behind the scenes as a scenario writer, director, and film producer for actor Hughie Mack's films. He occasionally cast himself in bit parts in the films he worked on. When Mack left Vitagraph, Semon began playing the lead roles. He usually played a white-faced goof in derby hat and overalls who would enter any given setting (a bakery, a restaurant, a construction site, a prison camp, etc.) and cause chaos, with people being covered with debris and property being destroyed. His short slapstick comedies were made and released quickly and prolifically, making Semon very familiar to moviegoers.

As his fame grew, his films expanded from one reel (about 12 minutes) to two reels, and Semon was given a free hand in making them. This became a dangerous policy because Semon became notorious for being expensive and extravagant: his two-reel comedies could easily cost more than an average five-reel feature film. As a former cartoonist, Semon staged similarly cartoony sight gags. These were not achieved with camera tricks or miniatures: Semon used full-sized props and structures, but on an epic scale. No gag was too big for Semon. He loved chase sequences involving airplanes (sometimes using three in a film), exploding barns, falling water towers, auto wrecks and/or explosions, and liberal use of substances in which to douse people. A typical Semon comedy might involve barrels of flour, sacks of soot, gallons of ink, pools of motor oil, or pits filled with mud. For example, in Semon's The Bell Hop, a man sleeping under the spray of a malfunctioning fountain imagines he is swimming in the ocean, and in his sleep he dives off the bed, through the floor, and into a vat of paint in the lobby below. Oliver Hardy recalled in an interview that Semon, when staging his comedy short The Sawmill set in a lumber camp, would not film in the studio and use traditional, painted stage sets. Instead, Semon took his troupe on location -- itself an expensive undertaking -- and insisted on building permanent log cabins, complete with modern conveniences for the entire cast and crew. The production budget soared, and his bosses at Vitagraph finally demanded that Semon become his own producer and underwrite his productions personally.

Semon also spent freely in his personal life, with frequent long-distance travel. Director Norman Taurog recalled that by the mid-1920s Semon would hand a script to him and then depart for New York, leaving Taurog to film the script with stunt double Bill Hauber impersonating Semon. Upon Semon's return to Hollywood, Taurog would film close-ups of Semon to fit into the action filmed with Hauber.

Semon tried to reverse his money problems by entering the more lucrative field of feature films. He produced and starred in a few features in the mid-1920s, including the financial disaster The Wizard of Oz in 1925; but by 1927 he was back in short subjects released through Educational Pictures. After filing for bankruptcy in March 1928, Semon returned to vaudeville. While traveling on the vaudeville circuit, he suffered a nervous breakdown and went back to Los Angeles.

Death
After returning to Los Angeles, Semon was admitted to a sanatorium in Victorville, California, where on October 8, 1928—at the age of 39—he died of pneumonia and tuberculosis. His wife Dorothy Dwan was reported to be at his bedside when he died. In its obituary for Semon, the trade paper Variety speculated that ongoing stress related to his dire financial circumstances was a contributing factor in his demise, alluding to the 1925 production of The Wizard of Oz as the major cause of his money woes:

Nicknames
French audiences knew him as Zigoto, Italian ones as Ridolini, and Spanish ones as Jaimito ("Jimmy") in pre-war releases and Tomasín ("Tommy") in the 1940 rereleases by Manuel Rotellar.

Filmography 

As a director, not a star:
 Bringing Up Father (unconfirmed as director) (1915)
 Tubby Turns the Tables (1916)
 Terry's Tea Party (1916)
 Out Ag'in, in Ag'in (1916)
 More Money Than Manners (1916)
 The Battler (1916)
 Losing Weight (1916)
 The Man from Egypt (1916)
 A Jealous Guy (1916)
 Romance and Roughhouse (1916)
 There and Back (1916)
 A Villainous Villain (1916)
 Love and Loot (1916)
 Sand, Scamps and Strategy (1916)
 She Who Last Laughs (1916)
 Walls and Wallops (1916)
 Jumps and Jealousy (1916)
 His Conscious Conscience (1916)
 Hash and Havoc (1916)
 Captain Jinks' Evolution (1916)
 Rah! Rah! Rah! (1916)
 Help! Help! Help! (1916)
 Shanks and Chivalry (1916)
 Speed and Spunk (1917)
 Captain Jinks' Widow (1917)
 Captain Jinks' Nephew's Wife (1917)
 Captain Jinks' Dilemma (1917)
 Bullies and Bullets (1917)
 Jolts and Jewelry (1917)
 Big Bluffs and Bowling Balls (1917)
 Somewhere in Any Place (1917)
 Rips and Rushes (1917)
 He Never Touched Me (1917)
 Cops and Cussedness (1917)
 Masks and Mishaps (1917)
 Guff and Gunplay (1917)
 Pests and Promises (1917)
 Footlights and Fakers (1917)
 Bombs and Blunders (1917)
 Turks and Troubles (1917)
 Flatheads and Flivvers (1917)
 Dubs and Drygoods (1917)
 Hazards and Home Runs (1917)

 Gall and Gasoline (1917)
 Boasts and Boldness (1917)
 Worries and Wobbles (1917)
 Shells and Shivers (1917)
As a Comedy Star:
 Chumps and Chances (1917)
 Gall and Golf (1917)
 Slips and Slackers (1917)
 Risks and Roughnecks (1917)
 Plans and Pajamas (1917)
 Plagues and Puppy Love (1917)
 Sports and Splashes (1917)
 Tough Luck and Tin Lizzies (1917)
 Rough Toughs and Roof Tops (1917)
 Spooks and Spasms (1917)
 Noisy Naggers and Nosey Neighbors (1917)
 Guns and Greasers (1918)
 Babes and Boobs (1918)
 Rooms and Rumors (1918)
 Meddlers and Moonshiners (1918)
 Stripes and Stumbles (1918)
 Rummies and Razors (1918)
 Whistles and Windows (1918)
 Spies and Spills (1918)
 Romans and Rascals (1918)
 Skids and Scalawags (1918)
 Boodle and Bandits (1918)
 Hindoos and Hazards (1918)
 Bathing Beauties and Big Boobs (1918)
 Dunces and Dangers (1918)
 Mutts and Motors (1918)
 Huns and Hyphens (1918)
 Bears and Bad Men (1918)
 Frauds and Frenzies (1918)
 Humbugs and Husbands (1918)
 Pluck and Plotters (1918)
 Traps and Tangles (1919)
 Scamps and Scandals (1919)
 Well, I'll Be (1919)
  (1919)
 The Star Boarder (1919)
 His Home Sweet Home (1919)
 The Simple Life (1919)
 Between the Acts (1919)

 Dull Care (1919)
 Dew Drop Inn (1919)
 The Head Waiter (1919)
 The Grocery Clerk (1919)
 The Fly Cop (1920)
 School Days (1920)
 Solid Concrete (1920)
 The Stage Hand (1920)
 The Suitor (1920)
 The Sportsman (1921)
 The Hick (1921)
 The Bakery (1921)
 The Rent Collector (1921)
 The Fall Guy (1921)
 The Bell Hop (1921)
 The Sawmill (1922)
 The Show (1922)
 A Pair of Kings (1922)
 Golf (1922)
 The Agent (1922)
 The Counter Jumper (1922)
 No Wedding Bells (1923)
 The Barnyard (1923)
 The Midnight Cabaret (1923)
 The Gown Shop (1923)
 Lightning Love (1923)
 Horseshoes (1923)
 Trouble Brewing (1924)
 The Girl in the Limousine (1924)
 Her Boy Friend (1924)
 Kid Speed (1924)
 My Best Girl (1925)
 Wizard of Oz (1925)
 The Dome Doctor (1925)
 The Cloudhopper (1925)
 Stop, Look and Listen (1926)
 Pass the Dumplings (1927)
 Spuds (1927)
 The Plumber's Daughter (1927)
 A Dozen Socks (1927) (uncredited)
 The Stunt Man (1927)
 Oh, What a Man! (1927)
 Underworld (1927)
 Dummies (1928)
 A Simple Sap (1928)

Gallery

References

External links

Larry Semon: The Cartoonist as Comic (Part 1), (Part 2), (Part 3)
Larry Semon at Virtual History
 Lambiek Comiclopedia article.
Larry Semon at Find a grave

1889 births
1928 deaths
Male actors from Mississippi
American male film actors
American male screenwriters
American male silent film actors
20th-century deaths from tuberculosis
Deaths from pneumonia in California
People from West Point, Mississippi
Vaudeville performers
Silent film comedians
People from Victorville, California
Film directors from California
Film directors from Mississippi
20th-century American male actors
Articles containing video clips
20th-century American comedians
American male comedy actors
Screenwriters from California
Screenwriters from Mississippi
American cartoonists
American comics artists
American graphic designers
American people of Dutch-Jewish descent
20th-century American male writers
20th-century American screenwriters
Tuberculosis deaths in California